Nudie Mobiles are vehicles customized by the designer Nudie Cohn.

History
Nudie was a Ukrainian-American tailor, known for designing rhinestone-covered outfits worn by celebrities as Elvis Presley and Johnny Cash.  Between 1950 and 1975 he customized 18 Cadillac and Pontiac convertibles with typical Nudie icons, such as silver-dollar-studded dashboards, pistol door handles, and longhorn steer horns as hood ornaments. Presley almost got himself a Nudie mobile, "In 1972, Nudie made a [customized] car for Elvis 'cause Elvis thought, Well I've got to have that in my collection'...but his manager would not let Nudie get close to Elvis."

The  "Nudie Mobiles" have become collector's items. Nudie's Online Car Museum with 16 cars, Los Angeles. One car is in the Country Music Hall of Fame in Nashville, Tennessee. In 1972 and 1974 two cars were bought by Bobbejaan Schoepen, a Belgian entertainer with a passion for country music.

References

Decorated vehicles